Border Incident is a 1949 film noir featuring Ricardo Montalbán, George Murphy, Howard Da Silva. Directed by Anthony Mann, the MGM production was written by John C. Higgins and George Zuckerman. The film was shot by cinematographer John Alton, who used shadows and lighting effects to involve an audience despite the fact that the film was shot on a low budget.

Premise
The story concerns two agents, one Mexican (PJF) and one American, who are tasked to stop the smuggling of Mexican migrant workers across the border to California. The two agents go undercover, one as a poor migrant.

Cast
 Ricardo Montalbán as Pablo Rodriguez
 George Murphy as Jack Bearnes
 Howard Da Silva as Owen Parkson
 James Mitchell as Juan Garcia
 Arnold Moss as Zopilote
 Alfonso Bedoya as Cuchillo
 Teresa Celli as Maria Garcia
 Charles McGraw as Jeff Amboy
 José Torvay as Pocoloco
 John Ridgely as Mr. Neley
 Arthur Hunnicutt as Clayton Nordell
 Sig Ruman as Hugo Wolfgang Ulrich
 Jack Lambert as Chuck
 Otto Waldis as Fritz

Production
The film was among a number of lower budgeted movies produced at MGM under the regime of Dore Schary.

Reception
According to MGM records the film earned $580,000 in the US and Canada and $328,000 overseas resulting in a loss of $194,000.

Critical response
Roger Westcombe compared the film to classic Westerns:  "Yet far from a typical Western's sense of freedom, Border Incident shares with [director Mann's previous film noir] T-Men that film's inky, submerged visual quality. These are 'wide' but not 'open' spaces, as Alton's beautifully registered grey-toned but grim visuals make the distant horizons as closed as the American border. The constant presence of vulnerable, innocent peasants adds a piquancy to Border Incident, raising the stakes from the destiny of a mere two police agents to that of an entire underclass."

References

Notes

Bibliography
 Harry Tomicek: Das grosse Schwarz. Border Incident, von Anthony Mann, Kamera: John Alton (1949). In: Christian Cargnelli, Michael Omasta .(eds.): Schatten. Exil. Europäische Emigranten im Film noir. PVS, Vienna 1997, .

External links
 
 
 
 
 

1949 films
1949 crime films
American crime films
American black-and-white films
1940s English-language films
Film noir
Films scored by André Previn
Films about illegal immigration to the United States
Films directed by Anthony Mann
Metro-Goldwyn-Mayer films
Procedural films
1940s American films